Miramax Books was an American publishing company started by Bob and Harvey Weinstein of Miramax Films to publish movie tie-ins. Between 2000 and 2005, while Jonathan Burnham was its president and editor-in-chief, the imprint published the memoirs of many major celebrities, including David Boies, Madeleine Albright, Rudy Giuliani, and Tim Russert, as well as Helen DeWitt's The Last Samurai. It later published the first three books of the Percy Jackson & the Olympians series before being folded into Hyperion Books in late 2007. 

Burnham was appointed in December 1998, planning to publish 10 to 15 books a year, both fiction and non-fiction, starting in 2000. Between 2000 and 2002, it was a division of Miramax's Talk Media, known as Talk Miramax Books. Tina Brown, chair of Talk Media, recruited a number of high-profile authors for the imprint, such as historian Simon Schama and British novelist Martin Amis. Rudy Giuliani was paid $3 million in advance for his autobiography (prior to 9/11). By April 2002, Talk Miramax had published 30 books, five of which had made national bestseller lists. The unit generated $10 million in revenue in 2001 and was profitable. 

After Brown left Talk Media in 2002, it was again renamed to Miramax Books. In 2004, Miramax Books won the auction for Riordan's The Lightning Thief manuscript. 

When the Weinsteins broke from Disney in 2005, five years before Miramax Films went for sale by Disney, the book division was still partly owned by the Weinsteins. A joint operation agreement for the company was made ending on September 30, 2007. Weinstein Brothers brought in CEO Rob Weisbach, for Miramax Books while he also ran the Weinstein Books imprint at The Weinstein Company. Hyperion Books president Robert Miller, and Disney Publishing Worldwide president, Deborah Dugan, would be acquiring new books. Also, a financial stake in any books on the publication schedule from April 2005 to September 2007 would remain with the Weinsteins.

Bestsellers 
 Martin Amis: Experience (2000)
 Helen DeWitt: The Last Samurai (2000)
 Jerri Nielsen (with Maryanne Vollers): Ice Bound: A Doctor's Incredible Battle for Survival at the South Pole (2001)
 Rudy Giuliani: Leadership (2002)
 Queen Noor of Jordan: Leap of Faith: Memoirs of an Unexpected Life (2003)
 Madeleine Albright: Madam Secretary (2003)
 Plum Sykes: Bergdorf Blondes (2004)
 Tim Russert: Big Russ and Me (2004)

References 

Defunct book publishing companies of the United States
Former subsidiaries of The Walt Disney Company
Publishing companies disestablished in 2005
Miramax
Harvey Weinstein